Viva! Roxy Music was the first live Roxy Music album. It was released in July 1976 and was recorded at three venues in the United Kingdom between 1973 and 1975. The recordings were from the band's shows at the Glasgow Apollo in November 1973, Newcastle City Hall in October 1974 and the Wembley Empire Pool in October 1975.

Track listing
All songs written by Bryan Ferry except "Out of the Blue" by Ferry and Phil Manzanera.

Personnel
Roxy Music
 Bryan Ferry – vocals, keyboard
 Eddie Jobson – electric violin, synthesizer, keyboards
 Andy Mackay – saxophone, oboe
 Phil Manzanera – guitar
 Paul Thompson – drums
 John Wetton – bass (except on "Pyjamarama", "Chance Meeting" and "Both Ends Burning")
 John Gustafson – bass (on "Both Ends Burning")
 Sal Maida – bass (on "Pyjamarama" and "Chance Meeting")
 Rick Wills – bass (credited on the album, despite not playing on any of the tracks, because he was the band's bassist at the time the album was compiled)
Additional personnel
 The Sirens (Doreen Chanter and Jacqui Sullivan) – backing vocals (on "Both Ends Burning")

Charts

Certifications

References

Albums produced by Chris Thomas (record producer)
1976 live albums
Roxy Music live albums
Island Records live albums
E.G. Records live albums
Polydor Records live albums
Atco Records live albums
Reprise Records live albums
Virgin Records live albums